Bruce Meyer (born April 23, 1957) is a Canadian poet, broadcaster, and educator—among other roles in the Canadian literary scene. He has authored more than 64 books of poetry, short fiction, non-fiction, and literary journalism. He is a professor of Writing and Communications at Georgian College in Barrie and Visiting Associate at Victoria College at the University of Toronto, where he has taught Poetry, Non-Fiction, and Comparative Literature.

His appearances on TVO’s More to Life and Big Ideas as well as CBC’s This Morning with Michael Enright have helped demystify poetry and the classics for thousands of Canadians. His CBC appearances remain the broadcaster's bestselling spoken-word CD series and inspired his 2000 bestseller The Golden Thread: A Reader’s Journey Through the Great Books.

Recent books of poetry include McLuhan’s Canary (2019), The First Taste: New and Selected Poems (2018), 1967: Centennial Year (2017), The Madness of Planets (2015), The Arrow of Time (2015), Testing the Elements (2014), A Litany of the Makers (2014), A Book of Bread (2011), and The Obsession Book of Timbuktu (2011).

From 1996 to 2003, he was Director of the Writing and Literature Program at the University of Toronto School of Continuing Studies where he created and directed the Creative Writing program—the largest in Canada—and the Professional Writing and Literary Studies programs.

He has organized dozens of literary conferences and festivals including Orillia's Leacock Summer Festival of Canadian Literature, Georgian College's International Festival of Authors and the first Indigenous Writers of Canada Conference, part of 2015's International Festival of Authors in Toronto.

He has given hundreds of talks on poetry, literature, mythology, creative writing, the works of William Shakespeare and the Homeric tradition. In 2000, he delivered the annual Whidden Lecture at McMaster University, a distinction previously bestowed on physicist Robert J. Oppenheimer and playwright Tom Stoppard.

His works have been published in Canada, United States, United Kingdom, Ireland, Switzerland, Italy, Spain, India, Pakistan, China, Nigeria, Bangladesh, Chile, Mexico, Yemen, Greece, Australia, Denmark, Netherlands, and have been translated into French, Spanish, Italian, Dutch, Danish, Hindi, Chinese, Urdu, Bangla, Greek, and Korean.

Education 
 Certificate of Post-Doctoral Studies, McMaster University, 1990
 Ph.D., Modern British Poetry, McMaster University, 1988
 Master of Arts, English, University of Toronto, 1982
 Bachelor of Arts, Honour English and Renaissance Studies, Victoria College, University of Toronto, 1980

Teaching 
 Visiting Professor, Victoria College, University of Toronto, 2013-
 Professor, University Studies, Liberal Arts, Georgian College, 2007-
 Professor, Laurentian University at Georgian College, 2004-2015
Special Instructor, University of Toronto, St. Michael's College, 2003–2010
 Professor, Seneca at York Program, 2005

Career Milestones 

 Inaugural Poet Laureate, City of Barrie, 2010-2014
 Co-founder, Barrie Arts and Culture Council, 2007-2011
 Artistic Director, Leacock Summer Festival of Canadian Literature, Orillia, 1998-2008
 Founder and director, University of Toronto School of Continuing Studies, Creative Writing and Literary Studies program, 1997-2003
 Writer-in-residence, University of Texas at Austin, 1999
 Writer-in-residence, University of Southern Mississippi, Hattiesburg, 1998
 Researcher/developer, World War One Canadian Literature Collection, National Library of Canada, 1988-1994
 Organizer, Indigenous Writers Conference, Georgian College, and International Festival of Authors, 2013 (a first for Ontario & Canada)
 Broadcaster (with Michael Enright), CBC's This Morning, The Sunday Edition, Great Books, A Novel Idea, Great Poetry: Poetry is Life and Vice Versa
 Discoverer and promoter of lost decade of Canadian Literature—Canada's World War One Trench Literature—published as We Wasn’t Pals: Canadian Poetry and Prose of the First World War (co-edited with Barry Callaghan, afterword by Margaret Atwood); Frank Prewett, The Selected Poems of Frank Prewett (Exile Editions); James Hanley, The German Prisoner (Exile Editions); W. Redvers Dent, Cry Havoc (Rocks Mills Press)

Select Awards 
 Bath Short Story Award (UK), finalist, 2019, 2020
 Bannister Poetry Competition, Niagara Branch, Canadian Authors’ Association, runner-up, 2020
 Libretto Chapbook Poetry Prize (NIG), second runner-up, 2020
 Fish Publishing Short Fiction Prize (IRE), finalist, 2020
 Dr. William Henry Drummond Poetry Prize, third place, 2019
 Thomas Morton Fiction Prize (CAN), runner-up, 2019
 Bath Short Story Award (UK), finalist, 2019
 Anton Chekhov Prize for Fiction (UK), winner, 2019
 Retreat West Fiction Prize (UK), finalist, 2019
 Tom Gallon Fiction Prize, Society of Authors (UK), short list, 2019
 National Poetry Prize (UK), short list, 2019
 London Independent Short Story Prize (UK), double short list, 2018
 Fish Publishing Poetry Prize (IRE), short list, 2018
 The Woolf Poetry Prize (Switzerland), winner, 2018
 Freefall Poetry Prize (CAN), third place, 2015, 2018
 Montreal International Poetry Prize, short List, 2015, 2017
 Simcoe Medal for services to the Arts in Barrie, 2017 & Barrie Arts Award, 2015
 Raymond Souster Prize (CAN), finalist, 2016
 Carter V. Cooper Short Fiction Prize (CAN), short list, 2015, 2016
 Barrie Arts Awards, Excellence in the Arts, Lifetime Achievement Award, 2015
 Gwendolyn MacEwen Prize for Poetry (CAN), best single poem winner, 2015, 2016
 Fred Cogswell Prize for best book of poems in Canada, third place, 2015
 Indie Fab Award Finalist (US), Independent Reviewers Association, 2015
 IP Medal best book of poetry (US), Independent Booksellers Association of America, 2015
 Inaugural Poet Laureate, City of Barrie, 2010-2014
 Ruth Cable Memorial Prize for Poetry (US), 1996
 E.J. Pratt Gold Medal and Prize for Poetry, 1980, 1981
 Alta Lind Cook Award (CAN), 1981, 1982
 TV Ontario Best Lecturer Competition, top-ten finalist, 2010
 Lifetime Pass, Baseball Hall of Fame, Cooperstown, New York, 1998
 Quoted on Heritage Toronto Plaque, Queen and Broadview

Bibliography

Poetry 

 The Hart Island Elegies, Urban Farmhouse Press, Windsor (forthcoming, May 2021)
 Grace of Falling Stars, Black Moss Press, Windsor (forthcoming, April 7, 2021)
 Telling the Bees, Libretto Press, Lagos, Nigeria, 2020
 McLuhan's Canary, Guernica Editions, Oakville, 2019
 The First Taste: New and Selected Poems, Black Moss Press, Windsor, 2018
 1967: Centennial Year, Black Moss Press, Windsor, 2017
 To Linares, Accento and Universidad Technologica Linares, Linares & Guadalajara, Mexico, 2016 
 The Madness of Planets, Black Moss Press, Windsor, 2015
 The Arrow of Time, Ronsdale Press, Vancouver, 2015 
 The Seasons, Porcupine's Quill, Erin, Ontario, 2014
 Testing the Elements, Exile Editions, Toronto, 2014
 The Obsession Book of Timbuktu, Black Moss Press, Windsor
 A Litany of the Makers, Lyrical Myrical Press, Toronto, 2014
 A Book of Bread, Exile Editions, Toronto, 2011
 Alphabestiary: A Poetry-Emblem Book (with H. Masud Taj), Exile Editions, 2011
 Bread: A Mass for Voices, Lyrical Myrical Press, Toronto, 2009
 Dog Days: A Comedy of Terriers, Black Moss Press, Windsor, 2009
 Mesopotamia, Scrivener Press, Sudbury, 2009
 As Yet, Untitled..., Lyrical Myrical Press, Toronto, 2006
 Oceans, Word Press, Cincinnati, Ohio, 2005
 Oceans, Exile Editions, Toronto, 2004
 The Spirit Bride, Exile Editions, Toronto, 2002
 Anywhere, Exile Editions, Toronto, 2000
 The Presence, Black Moss Press, Windsor, 1999 
 The Presence, Story Line Press, Ashland, Oregon, 1999
 Radio Silence, Black Moss Press, Windsor, 1991
 The Open Room, Black Moss Press, Windsor, 1989
 The Open Room, Aquilla Press, 1989
 Steel Valley (with James Deahl), Aureole Point Press, 1984
 The Aging of America, Aloysius Press, 1982
 The Tongues Between Us, SWOP, 1981 (36 pages)

Fiction 
 The Hours: Stories from a Pandemic (short stories), AOS Publishing, Montreal, 2021
 Down in the Ground (flash fiction), Guernica Editions, Oakville, 2020
 A Feast of Brief Hopes (short stories), Guernica Editions, Oakville, 2018
 A Chronicle of Magpies (short stories), Tightrope Books, Toronto, 2014
 Flights (short stories), Canadian-Korean Literary Forum Press, Toronto, 2004
 Goodbye Mr. Spalding (short stories), Black Moss Press, Windsor, 1996

Non-Fiction 

 Pressing Matters: A Story of Canadian Small Press Publishing, Black Moss Press, Windsor, 2019
 Portraits of Canadian Writers, Porcupine's Quill, Erin, 2016 
 Time of the Last Goal: Why Hockey is Our Game, Black Moss Press, Windsor, 2014
  Alphabet Table: Memoir of a Childhood in the Language, Black Moss Press, Windsor, 2010
 Heroes: The Champions of Our Literary Imaginations, Harper Collins, Toronto, 2007
 Dictionary of Literary Biography, Volume 282: The New Formalists, (co-edited with Jonathan Barron) Bruccoli Clarke Layman, Columbia, South Carolina, 2003
 The Golden Thread: A Reader's Journey Through the Great Books, Harper Collins Canada, Toronto, 2000
 Lives and Works: Interviews with Canadian Writers (with Brian O’Riordan), Black Moss Press, Toronto, 1991
 In Their Words: Interviews with Canadian Writers (with Brian O’Riordan), Anansi, Toronto, 1985
 Poetry Markets for Canadians (with James Deahl), League of Canadian Poets, Toronto, 1983

Works edited 

 That Dammed Beaver: Canadian Comedy Writing, Exile Editions, 2018
 Dent, W. Redvers. Cry Havoc, Rocks Mills Press, Oakville, 2018     
 Cli-Fi: Canadian Tales of Climate Change, Exile Editions, Toronto, 2018
 We Wasn't Pals: Canadian Poetry and Prose of the First World War 2nd Edition (with Barry Callaghan), Exile Editions, 2014
 The White-Collar Book: Canadian Poetry and Prose of the Professional World (with Carolyn Meyer), Black Moss Press, Windsor, 2011
 Hanley, James. The German Prisoner. Exile Editions, 2007
 Dictionary of Literary Biography, Volume 282: The New Formalists (with Jonathan Baron), Bruccoli Clarke Layman, Columbia, South Carolina, 2003
 Bae-Sa Moh: Writing by Korean-Canadian Youth, KCLF Press, Toronto, 2002
 We Wasn't Pals: Canadian Poetry and Prose of the First World War (with Barry Callaghan), Exile Editions, 2001
 Separate Islands: Contemporary British and Irish Poetry (with Carolyn Meyer), Quarry Press, 1987
 The Selected Poems of Frank Prewett (with Barry Callaghan), Exile Editions, 1987
 Arrivals: Canadian Poetry in the Eighties, Greenfield Press, 1986
 Poetry Markets for Canadians (with James Deahl, 1st ed.), League of Canadian Poets, 1986

Edited selected works by other authors 

 Books by Michael Mirolla, Marty Gervais, Victoria Butler, Antonia Facciponte, Kate Story, Karen Lee White, Christine Ottoni.
 Clarke, James. Selected Poems. Exile Editions, Toronto, 2012
 Stevens, Peter. Swimming in the Afternoon: The Selected Poems of Peter Stevens. [ed. and intro.] Black Moss Press, Windsor, 1992 
 Monteith, Lionel. And So He Went Sailing: The Collected Poems of Lionel Monteith. [ed. and intro.] Lincoln Publications, London, 1991
 Tomlinson, Charles. Selected and New Poems. [ed.] Exile Editions, Toronto, 1989
 Wevill, David. Figure of Eight: New Poems and Selected Translations. [ed.] Exile Editions, Toronto, 1987
 Wevill, David. Other Names for the Heart: Selected Poems, 1964-1984. [ed.] ExileEditions, Toronto, 1985
 Deahl, James. No Cold Ash: Selected Poems, 1966–1982. Sono Nis Press, 1984.

Cassette Tapes and CDs 

Great Poetry: Poetry Is Life and Vice Versa (with Michael Enright), CBC Radio, 2006
 The Great Books, Part One (with Michael Enright), CBC Radio, 1999 [The Bible, The Odyssey, The Theban Plays, The Aeneid, Metamorphoses]
 The Great Books, Part Two (with Michael Enright) CBC Radio, 1999 [Boethius, A Consolation of Philosophy; Saint Augustine, The Confessions; The Quest of the Holy Grail and Sir Gawain and the Green Knight; Dante, Inferno; Dante, La Vita Nuova; Shakespeare, The Sonnets]
 The Great Books, Part Three (with Michael Enright) CBC Radio, 1999 [Vasari, Lives of the Artists; Machiavelli, The Prince; More, Utopia; Shakespeare, King Lear; Shakespeare, The Tempest; Milton, Paradise Lost; Joyce, Ulysses].
 A Novel Idea (with Michael Enright) CBC Radio, 2000 [The Origins of the Novel, The Gothic Novel, The Historical Novel, The Novel of Ideas, The Prophetic Novel, The Role of the Novel].

Podcasts 

 Great Poetry (with Michael Enright and Billy Collins), Ideas, CBC Radio One and CBC Enterprises, March–May 2006

Articles on Bruce Meyer's Work 

 Benjamin Ghan. Bruce Meyer: Canadian Writers Series. Guernica Editions, Hamilton (forthcoming, 2023)
 Juan de Dios Torralbo-Caballero. The Poetry of Bruce Meyer: The inaugural poet laureate of the city of Barrie. Granada, Comares. 2015
 T.L. Ponick. Dictionary of Literary Biography. Vol. 282. 2003

Living people
20th-century Canadian poets
Canadian male poets
Canadian literary critics
Academic staff of Laurentian University
1957 births
Chapbook writers
20th-century Canadian male writers
Canadian male non-fiction writers
Academic staff of the University of Toronto